Shuangbei may refer to:

 Shuangbei Station, Chongqing, China
 Shuangbei Township, Hebei, China
 The Taipei–Keelung Metropolitan Area in Taiwan